The 2018 Brownlow Medal was the 91st year the award was presented to the player adjudged the fairest and best player during the Australian Football League (AFL) home-and-away season. Tom Mitchell of the Hawthorn Football Club won the medal with 28 votes.

Leading vote-getters

Voting procedure
The three field umpires (those umpires who control the flow of the game, as opposed to goal or boundary umpires) confer after each match and award three votes, two votes, and one vote to the players they regard as the best, second-best and third-best in the match, respectively. The votes are kept secret until the awards night, and they are read and tallied on the evening.

References 

2018 Australian Football League season
2018